İzmir Büyükşehir Belediyespor is a multi-sports club established 1979 in İzmir, Turkey by the city's metropolitan municipality. The club's colors are blue and white. İzmir Büyükşehir Belediyespor is active in a total of 21 branches, including Paralympic and many Olympic sports. The men's handball team of the club plays in the Turkish Handball Super League, the women's team in the Turkish Women's Handball Super League and the wheelchair basketball team in the Turkish Wheelchair Basketball Super League successfully.

Venues
Main venues of the club are:
 Bornova Ice Sports Hall inside the Aşık Veysel Recreational Area, Bornova: Ice hockey
 Celal Atik Sports Hall, Kültürpark: Basketball, handball, volleyball
 Evka-4 Sports Complex, Bornova: Basketball, handball, volleyball

Achievements

Handball
Men's
Turkish Handball Super League
 Champions (1): 2007–08

Women's

Turkish Women's Handball Super League
 Runners-up (1): 2010–11
 Third place (2): 2007–08, 2021–22

Ice hockey

 Turkish Ice Hockey Super League
 Champions (1): 2013–14.
 Runners-up (3): 2012–13, 2014–15, 2015–16

Wheelchair basketball
Turkish Wheelchair Basketball First League
 Champions (1): 1996–97

Turkish Wheelchair Basketball Super League
 Champions (4): 2000–01, 2001–02, 2002–03, 2003–04

André Vergauwen Cup
Runners-up (1): 2003.

Notable sportspeople
 İbrahim Arat (born 1988), weightlifter
 Remzi Başakbuğday (born 1989), taekwondo practitioner
 Recep Çelik (born 1987), racewalker
 Duygu Çete (born 1989), 2012 Summer Paralympics bronze medalist female visually impaired judoka
 Begül Löklüoğlu (born 1988), female archer
 Semiha Mutlu (born 1987), female racewalker

References

External links
 Official website

 
Athletics clubs in Turkey
Running clubs in Turkey
Turkish handball clubs
Volleyball clubs in İzmir
Archery in Turkey
Badminton in Turkey
Basketball teams in Turkey
Fencing in Turkey
Football clubs in Turkey
Gymnastics in Turkey
Ice hockey teams in Turkey
Judo in Turkey
Sailing in Turkey
Taekwondo in Turkey
Weightlifting in Turkey
Wheelchair basketball in Turkey
1979 establishments in Turkey
Sports clubs established in 1979